Holmview is a residential suburb in the City of Logan, Queensland, Australia.

Geography
It is located south-west of Brisbane, the state capital.  Much of the suburb is undeveloped bush.  Part of the suburb's northern border is marked by the Logan River.  The Beenleigh railway line passes through this northern section.  The Logan River Road, a major arterial, crosses Holmview from east to west.

History
On 1 May 1975, Holmview was designed a locality by Queensland Place Names Board. It was designated as a suburb on 7 February 2003. However, the name has a longer history with Holmview railway station being mentioned in railway timetables in 1886, the railway line to Beenleigh having opened on 27 July 1885. Despite its name, the railway station is now within the locality of Beenleigh. There is an 1889 electoral roll listing for William Mann, a leaseholder at "Holmview, Beenleigh".

Demographics
The median age of the Holmview population was 27 years, 10 years below the national median of 37.  73.2% of people living in Holmview were born in Australia. The other top responses for country of birth were New Zealand 9.2%, England 3.8%, South Africa 0.9%, Scotland 0.4%, Canada 0.4%.  87.8% of people spoke only English at home; the next most common languages were 0.9% Maori (New Zealand), 0.6% French, 0.6% Romanian, 0.4% Afrikaans, 0.4% Other Australian Indigenous Languages.

Education 
There are no schools in Holmview. The nearest primary school is Edens Landing State School in neighbouring Edens Landing. The nearest secondary schools are Windaroo Valley State High School in neighbouring Bahrs Scrub, Loganlea State High School in Loganlea and Beenleigh State High School in Beenleigh.

References

External links

 

Suburbs of Logan City